Libertad is the second and final studio album by American hard rock band Velvet Revolver, released on July 3, 2007. The name is Spanish and translates to "Liberty" or "freedom" in English. According to a 2007 interview with Rolling Stone, along with the Stone Temple Pilots albums Core and the self-titled 2010 album, Libertad is one of only three albums lead singer Scott Weiland wrote while sober.

Release and promotion
Velvet Revolver originally announced their plans for a second album in late 2005, when lead singer Scott Weiland said that the band was planning on recording a concept album. Although it is not certain how concrete the concept album plans were, they were eventually scrapped and the band began to work with producer Rick Rubin. However, the bandmembers felt that Rubin was not a good fit for the band and thus parted ways with him. In December 2006, Velvet Revolver began working with producer Brendan O'Brien, who had previously produced albums for Stone Temple Pilots, Weiland's former band. As Scott Weiland commented in Kerrang! magazine, "We were really excited about six months ago, when we first began writing. Then we really kind of flat-lined for a while, We didn't know which way we were going. Once Brendan (O'Brien) came on board, it was kind of like a shot in the arm. It was a new energy." Recording began on December 11 and continued through December, January, and February. The process was documented by a series of video blogs, or "Vlogs", available on the band's website.

On June 26, 2007, Velvet Revolver released a sneak peek of Libertad in its entirety.

Libertad was a released as an Enhanced-CD which includes a 10-minute video documentary called "Re-Evolution: The Making of Libertad" (Directed by Rocco Guarino). A deluxe Best Buy edition was also released which includes a DVD containing a 30-minute documentary called "Tierra Roja, Sangre Roja" (Directed by Rocco Guarino), that documented the band's journey across South America.

To promote the album, Velvet Revolver embarked on a South American tour with Aerosmith. The final performance saw 70,000 fans in attendance. Shortly thereafter, VR embarked on a North American club tour, revealing several new songs. The band also played major music festivals such as the Download Festival. In August 2007, they began a North American arena tour with Alice in Chains, and later toured Europe and Asia.

Songs from the album were featured at X Games XIII as being the official background music to the event. The track "Let It Roll" is also used as the official theme song for the 2007 WWE Diva Search. The song "American Man" has also been used in promotional ads for the popular drama Prison Break.

Reception

The album debuted at number five on the U.S. Billboard 200, selling 92,000 copies in its first week; as of October 12, 2007, it has sold 222,000 copies and had fallen off the charts. Compared to the multi-platinum success of Contraband, Libertad was seen as a commercial disappointment for the band. The album is certified Gold in New Zealand and Canada. Upon its release, Libertad received generally positive reviews and was said to possibly be "THE rock record of the summer" according to the Associated Press. Rolling Stone also gave the album a good review, stating that "there is plenty of thrill in the fuzz-lined hard-rubber bends of Slash's guitar breaks and the way bassist Duff McKagan keeps time, like a cop swinging a billy club" and that the album had "honest depth."

Controversy

Pinochet's regime allusion
The album's cover features a stylized 10 Chilean pesos coin produced from 1973 to 1990. The coin is an allusion to the Coup d'état in Chile in 1973 against the socialist president Salvador Allende. During the Augusto Pinochet military dictatorship, the coin bore the image of the winged female figure. To her side, in small Roman numerals, the date of the coup d'état is marked (September 11, 1973), and underneath the word Libertad ("Freedom", meant as "freedom" from Marxism) is written in capitals. After the restoration of democracy, Pinochet's winged female was replaced with the portrait of the Chilean independence hero Bernardo O'Higgins.

It was later stated by Slash, in an interview in September 2007 by 102.1 The Edge in Dallas, the image came from a friend's old Chilean 10 pesos necklace. Slash reported that he had no idea what the significance of the image was until a concert in Brazil.

Track listing

Personnel

Velvet Revolver
Scott Weiland – lead vocals, keyboards on "Get Out the Door" and "The Last Fight"
Slash – lead guitar, talkbox on "Get Out the Door", acoustic guitar on "Messages"
Duff McKagan – bass, backing vocals
Matt Sorum – drums, percussion on "Get Out the Door", backing vocals
Dave Kushner – rhythm guitar

Additional personnel
Brendan O'Brien – production, mixing
Bob Ludwig – mastering
Billy Bowers – additional engineering
Douglas Grean – additional engineering
Rocco Guarino – Video Director

Mixing assistance
Glenn Pittman
Kevin Mills
Matt Serrechio
Tom Syrowski
Tom Tapley

Charts

Certifications

Miscellaneous
Slash used a Vox AC30 amplifier to record some parts.
Slash played "The Last Fight" and "Gravedancer" clean parts with a Gretsch 6120 Setzer.

References

External links
 

Velvet Revolver albums
Concept albums
2007 albums
Albums produced by Brendan O'Brien (record producer)
RCA Records albums